Eumolpus robustus is a species of leaf beetle from North America. Its range spans from Central America (Costa Rica, Nicaragua, El Salvador, Honduras, Guatemala) north to Mexico and Arizona. The species feeds on plants in the family Apocynaceae.

The species was first described as Chrysochus robustus by the American entomologist George Henry Horn in 1885, from specimens collected in Arizona. However, Horn later synonymised it with Eumolpus surinamensis, following Martin Jacoby's description from 1882. Much later, E. robustus was restored as a separate species within Eumolpus, as it was determined to be a very different species from E. surinamensis.

References

Further reading

 

Eumolpinae
Articles created by Qbugbot
Beetles of Central America
Beetles of North America
Beetles described in 1885
Taxa named by George Henry Horn